Yuliyan Popev (born 7 July 1986) is a Bulgarian footballer who plays as a left back for Septemvri Simitli.

References

External links
 

1986 births
Living people
Bulgarian footballers
First Professional Football League (Bulgaria) players
OFC Pirin Blagoevgrad players
PFC Pirin Blagoevgrad players
PFC Slavia Sofia players
FC Bansko players
FC Vitosha Bistritsa players
FC Septemvri Sofia players
FC Strumska Slava Radomir players
Macedonian Bulgarians
Association football defenders
Sportspeople from Blagoevgrad